Omega Factor may refer to:
 Astro Boy: Omega Factor, video game
 The Omega Factor, BBC TV series